The flag of the UNTAC was used in Cambodia during the United Nations Transitional Authority in Cambodia (1992–1993).

Symbolism 
The flag derived from the UN flag, as it was a United Nations protectorate. The map contains the word Kâmpŭchéa in Khmer script ("Cambodia").

See also 
 Flag of Cambodia

References

UNTAC